The 1936 FA Charity Shield was the 23rd FA Charity Shield, a football match between the winners of the previous season's First Division and FA Cup competitions. The match was contested by FA Cup winners Arsenal and league champions Sunderland, and was played at Roker Park, the home ground of Sunderland. Sunderland won 2-1.

Arsenal were making their sixth out of seven and fourth consecutive appearance in the Charity Shield, reflecting their dominance of the English game in the 1930s. Arsenal had lost 1-0 to Sheffield Wednesday in 1935, but had won in their previous four appearances. Sunderland were contesting their first Charity Shield, although they had won the competition's precursor, the Sheriff of London Charity Shield, in 1903.

As in the previous year  the match was criticized as a "drab and disappointing" game which "never rose to great heights". The Daily Mail complained that as a mid-week game with little prestige in victory, the Charity Shield offered little incentive to competitive football. With the score 0-0 at half time, Sunderland managed to gain momentum with attacks from their half-backs, and took the lead on 53 minutes through a Burbanks goal.  Arsenal responded more positively and equalized on the 77th minute. The winning goal came controversially when Carter's long distance shot bounced down off the crossbar before being cleared by Arsenal, but was determined to have crossed the line by the linesman.

The second half of the match was broadcast with live commentary by Ivan Sharpe on the BBC's Northern radio station.

Match details

References

1936
Charity Shield 1936
Charity Shield 1936
Comm
FA Charity Shield